The Winchester Model 1907 is a blowback-operated, semi-automatic rifle produced by the Winchester Repeating Arms Company beginning in 1907 with production ending in 1957. It fired a cartridge of intermediate power, cycled through a semi-automatic operating mechanism, fed from a 5, 10, or 15 round detachable box magazine located immediately forward of the trigger guard. In size and handling, it is much like an M1 carbine, though the 1907 is heavier and fires a much harder hitting round.

The only cartridge offered by Winchester as a factory chambering in the Model 1907 was the .351SL centerfire.

Variants
In addition to the standard or "plain finish" model, a deluxe or "fancy finish" model was offered with pistol grip stock and checkering on the forearm and wrist of the stock. The plain finish rifles were offered in 1907 at a list price of $28 (approximately $730 in 2016). A barrel sleeve with Krag bayonet mount and front sight was also an option with the "police rifle".

In the late 1930s, the 1907 was updated by Winchester with a much thicker fore-end (eliminating the cracking problems common to the earlier models) and stock. The newer model also had a redesigned charging handle which made it easier to lock the bolt back. At the same time, a variant for police use was introduced, featuring an M1892 Krag bayonet lug, and the possibility of using an extended magazine for 20 rounds. For a long time, on the Internet, a photo of a similar rifle from the Cody Firearms Museum (USA), S/N 47357, manufactured in 1935, was presented as a "French order of the First World War", having nothing to do with it.

Patents
The basic design for the Model 1907 is covered by  issued August 27, 1901, and assigned to Winchester by Thomas Crossley Johnson, a key firearms designer for Winchester. This patent was initially used to protect the design of the rimfire Winchester Model 1903, but came to be applied toward the centerfire Winchester Self Loading rifle series, which includes the Model 1905, Model 1907, and Model 1910.

List of Patents
 Small cartridge, Winchester Model 1903
 Box magazine
 Large cartridge, self-loading, box magazine, takedown rifle (Winchester Model 1905)
 Cartridge extractor
 Forearm tip
 Recoil buffer
 Buttstock bolt

World War I use

France
The government initially ordered 300 Model 1907 rifles in October 1915 from Winchester, soon followed by an order for 2,500 more rifles. Ammunition orders for these rifles exceeded 1.5 million cartridges of .351SL before 1917. Subsequent orders in 1917 and 1918 totaled 2,200 Model 1907 rifles. 

From unknown sources, it was previously claimed that allegedly according to factory records, these rifles were modified for fully automatic fire and fitted with Lee-Navy rifle bayonets. These rifles allegedly were designated by the name of Winchester Model 1907/17, they used either a 15-round magazine or 20-round magazine and fired from 600 to 700 rounds per minute. Ultimately, no evidence of this was found; the above configuration was actually introduced by Winchester in the 1930s for police use and these rifles were never converted to full auto.

Great Britain
According to a November 1, 1916 Winchester internal report, Great Britain's London Armory was sent 120 Model 1907 rifles and 78,000 rounds of .351SL ammunition  between December 1914 and April 1916 for use by the Royal Flying Corps. These rifles were specially modified for aerial use by increasing the size of the trigger guard and cocking piece to allow the use of heavy gloves and were intended to use 15-round magazines. These rifles were intended to arm airplane observers.

Russia
The Imperial Russian government is recorded by Winchester as purchasing 500 Model 1907 rifles and 1.5 million rounds of .351SL ammunition through the J.P. Morgan Company in May 1916.

United States
According to factory records, the 1st Aero Squadron of the U.S. Army Signal Corps Air Service was shipped 19 Model 1907 rifles and 9000 cartridges of .351SL ammunition. The 1st Aero Squadron's shipment was sent to Columbus, New Mexico and was presumably used in arming their aircraft while in support of General Pershing's Punitive Expedition.

Law enforcement
The Model 1907 was a popular rifle with law enforcement in the United States during much of its production - especially in the 1930s when the police in the United States were upgrading their firearms due to the increase in crime. The Federal Bureau of Investigation acquired some Model 1907 rifles in response to the 1933 Kansas City Massacre. It was used by Patrol Inspectors of the U.S. Border Patrol during the late 1920s into the 1930s.

See also
Ribeyrolles 1918 automatic carbine
Remington Model 8

References

.351 WSL semi-automatic rifles
Weapons and ammunition introduced in 1907
Winchester Repeating Arms Company firearms
World War I French infantry weapons
World War I Russian infantry weapons
Rifles of the United States
Police weapons